Noureddin Razavi Sarvestani (April 11, 1935 – April 27, 2000) was an Iranian vocalist of Persian classical and pop music. One of his notable students is Reza Shirmarz who is more active in theater and book industries.

See also 
 Music of Iran
 Persian pop music

References

1935 births
2000 deaths
Sarvestan
Iranian pop singers
20th-century Iranian male singers